Soledad Acosta Kemble (5 May 1833 – 17 March 1913) was a Colombian writer and journalist. A sophisticated, well-travelled, and social woman, she received a much higher and better rounded education than most women of her time and country, and enjoyed a high standing in society, not only for her family background, but for her own literary endeavours. She collaborated in various newspapers including El Comercio, El Deber, and Revista Americana, among other periodicals. Using her writings, she was a feminist well ahead of her time, she lobbied for equal education for women, and wrote on various topics pertaining to female participation in society and family, encouraging others to become proactive in the workforce and in the restoration of society.

Personal life 
Soledad was born on 5 May 1833, to Tomás Joaquín de Acosta y Pérez de Guzmán, and Caroline Kemble Rowe in Bogotá. Her father was a native of Guaduas, New Kingdom of Granada, the son of Spanish settlers, he was a scientist, diplomat and general; her mother, a native of Kingston, Jamaica, was the daughter of Gideon Kemble, an American Scotsman and Collector of the Port of Kingston, and his wife Tomasa (née Rowe). On 5 May 1855 she married José María Samper Agudelo, a renowned writer and journalist, and together they had four daughters, Bertilda, who become a nun, and took up poetry like her parents, Carolina (b. 1857) and María Josefa (b. 1860), both of whom died in 1872 during a smallpox outbreak in Bogotá, and Blanca Leonor (b. 1862).

Selected works

References

External links 
 
 

1833 births
1913 deaths
People from Bogotá
Colombian people of Scottish descent
Samper family
Colombian feminists
Colombian women writers
Colombian journalists
19th-century Colombian historians
Muisca scholars
Burials at Central Cemetery of Bogotá
Women historians